Special Forces is an album by Julian Fane, released in 2004.

Track listing
"Disaster Location" - 3:57
"Safety Man" - 3:46
"Freezing In Haunted Water" - 6:09
"Sea Island" - 2:18
"Stasis" - 5:24
"Darknet" - 5:08
"Book Repository" - 5:55
"The Birthday Boys" - 6:39
"Taoist Blockade" - 3:46
"Coronation" - 2:03
"In Space" - 4:19
"Exit New Year" - 7:25

2004 albums